The following outline is provided as an overview of and topical guide to Egypt:

Egypt (  ) is a sovereign country located in eastern North Africa that includes the Sinai Peninsula, a land bridge to Asia. Its northern coast borders the Mediterranean Sea; the eastern coast borders the Red Sea. Egypt is famous for its ancient civilization and some of the world's oldest monuments, including the Giza pyramid complex with the Great Sphinx, the step pyramid at Sakkara, Edfu Temple, Abu Simbel, etc. The southern city of Luxor contains numerous ancient artifacts, such as the Karnak Temple and the Valley of the Kings. Egypt is widely regarded as an important political and cultural nation of the Middle East, as center of the Arab World. Egypt, historically, has been the northern "Gateway to Africa" with many scientific expeditions organized from Cairo.

General reference 
 Pronunciation: 
 Common English country name: Egypt
 Official English country name: The Arab Republic of Egypt
 Common endonym(s): Misr
 Official endonym(s): Ǧumhūriyyat Miṣr al-ʿArabiyyah
 Adjectival(s): Egyptian 
 Demonym(s):
 Etymology: Name of Egypt
 International rankings of Egypt
 ISO country codes:  EG, EGY, 818
 ISO region codes:  See ISO 3166-2:EG
 Internet country code top-level domain: .eg

Geography of Egypt 

Geography of Egypt

 Egypt is: a country
 Location
 Egypt is situated within the following regions:
 Northern Hemisphere and Eastern Hemisphere
 Africa
 North Africa
 Sahara Desert
 Middle East
 Time zone: Egypt Standard Time (UTC+02), Egypt Daylight Time (UTC+03) April–September
 Extreme points of Egypt
 High: Mount Catherine 
 Low: Qattara Depression 
 Land boundaries:  
 
 
 and  
 Coastline:  
 Population of Egypt: 88,662,800 people (2015 estimate) - 15th most populous country
 Area of Egypt:   - 30th largest country
 Atlas of Egypt

Environment of Egypt 

 Climate of Egypt
 Environmental issues in Egypt
 Ecoregions of Egypt
 Renewable energy in Egypt
 Geology of Egypt
 Wildlife of Egypt
 Fauna of Egypt
 Birds of Egypt
 Mammals of Egypt
 Center for Documentation of Cultural and Natural Heritage

Geographic features of Egypt 

 Deserts of Egypt
 Western Desert
 Eastern Desert
 Glaciers in Egypt: none
 Lakes of Egypt
 Rivers of Egypt
 World Heritages Sites in Egypt
 Suez Canal

Regions of Egypt 

 Nile Valley and Delta
 Western Desert (also known as the Libyan Desert)
 Eastern Desert (also known as the Arabian Desert)
 Sinai Peninsula

Ecoregions of Egypt 

List of ecoregions in Egypt

Administrative divisions of Egypt 
Administrative divisions of Egypt
 Governorates of Egypt (27)
 Markazes of Egypt (166)
 Municipalities of Egypt
 Districts of Egypt

Governorates of Egypt 

Governorates of Egypt

Municipalities of Egypt 

List of cities in Egypt
 Capital of Egypt: Cairo (outline)

Demography of Egypt 
Demographics of Egypt
 Censuses of Egypt
 DNA history of Egypt
 Population history of Egypt

Ethnicities

Nationalities

Government and politics of Egypt 
Politics of Egypt
 Form of government: Semi-presidential republic
 Capital of Egypt: Cairo
 Elections in Egypt
 Political parties in Egypt
 Egyptian Revolution of 2011

Branches of the government of Egypt 

Government of Egypt

Executive branch of the government of Egypt 
 Head of state: is the President of Egypt.
 Head of government: is the President of Egypt.
 Cabinet of Egypt

Legislative branch of the government of Egypt 
 Parliament of Egypt – it was dissolved by the army of Egypt on 11 February 2011.
 Upper house: Shura Council
 Lower house: People's Assembly of Egypt

Judicial branch of the government of Egypt 

Egyptian Judicial System
 Supreme Constitutional Court of Egypt
 Court of Appeal
 Court of First Instance
 Family Court

Foreign relations of Egypt 

Foreign relations of Egypt

International organization membership 
The Arab Republic of Egypt is a member of:

African Development Bank Group (AfDB)
African Union (AU)
Malvern College Egypt (MCE)
Arab Bank for Economic Development in Africa (ABEDA)
Arab Fund for Economic and Social Development (AFESD)
Arab Monetary Fund (AMF)
Black Sea Economic Cooperation Zone (BSEC) (observer)
Common Market for Eastern and Southern Africa (COMESA)
Council of Arab Economic Unity (CAEU)
European Bank for Reconstruction and Development (EBRD)
Food and Agriculture Organization (FAO)
Group of 15 (G15)
Group of 24 (G24)
Group of 77 (G77)
International Atomic Energy Agency (IAEA)
International Bank for Reconstruction and Development (IBRD)
International Chamber of Commerce (ICC)
International Civil Aviation Organization (ICAO)
International Criminal Court (ICCt) (signatory)
International Criminal Police Organization (Interpol)
International Development Association (IDA)
International Federation of Red Cross and Red Crescent Societies (IFRCS)
International Finance Corporation (IFC)
International Fund for Agricultural Development (IFAD)
International Hydrographic Organization (IHO)
International Labour Organization (ILO)
International Maritime Organization (IMO)
International Mobile Satellite Organization (IMSO)
International Monetary Fund (IMF)
International Olympic Committee (IOC)
International Organization for Migration (IOM)
International Organization for Standardization (ISO)
International Red Cross and Red Crescent Movement (ICRM)
International Telecommunication Union (ITU)
International Telecommunications Satellite Organization (ITSO)

Inter-Parliamentary Union (IPU)
Islamic Development Bank (IDB)
League of Arab States (LAS)
Multilateral Investment Guarantee Agency (MIGA)
Nonaligned Movement (NAM)
Organisation internationale de la Francophonie (OIF)
Organisation of Islamic Cooperation (OIC)
Organization for Security and Cooperation in Europe (OSCE) (partner)
Organization of American States (OAS) (observer)
Organization of Arab Petroleum Exporting Countries (OAPEC)
Permanent Court of Arbitration (PCA)
United Nations (UN)
United Nations Conference on Trade and Development (UNCTAD)
United Nations Educational, Scientific, and Cultural Organization (UNESCO)
United Nations High Commissioner for Refugees (UNHCR)
United Nations Industrial Development Organization (UNIDO)
United Nations Mission for the Referendum in Western Sahara (MINURSO)
United Nations Mission in Liberia (UNMIL)
United Nations Mission in the Central African Republic and Chad (MINURCAT)
United Nations Mission in the Sudan (UNMIS)
United Nations Observer Mission in Georgia (UNOMIG)
United Nations Organization Mission in the Democratic Republic of the Congo (MONUC)
United Nations Relief and Works Agency for Palestine Refugees in the Near East (UNRWA)
Universal Postal Union (UPU)
World Customs Organization (WCO)
World Federation of Trade Unions (WFTU)
World Health Organization (WHO)
World Intellectual Property Organization (WIPO)
World Meteorological Organization (WMO)
World Tourism Organization (UNWTO)
World Trade Organization (WTO)

Egypt is 1 of only 7 U.N. members which is not a member of the Organisation for the Prohibition of Chemical Weapons.

Law and order in Egypt 
Law of Egypt
 Cannabis in Egypt
 Capital punishment in Egypt
 Constitution of Egypt
 Crime in Egypt
 Human rights in Egypt
 LGBT rights in Egypt
 Freedom of religion in Egypt
 Law enforcement in Egypt
 Emergency law in Egypt

Media of Egypt 
Media of Egypt

Military of Egypt 
Military of Egypt
 Command
 Commander-in-chief:
 Ministry of Defence of Egypt
 Forces
 Army of Egypt
 Navy of Egypt
 Air Force of Egypt
 Military history of Egypt
 Military ranks of Egypt

History of Egypt 
History of Egypt

History of Egypt, by period 
 History of Ancient Egypt: 3100 BC to 639 AD
 Ancient Egypt
 List of ancient Egypt topics
 Early Dynastic Period of Egypt
 First Dynasty of Egypt c. 3150–2890
 Second Dynasty of Egypt: 2890–2686
 Old Kingdom of Egypt
 Third Dynasty of Egypt: 2686–2613
 Fourth Dynasty of Egypt: 2613–2498
 Fifth Dynasty of Egypt: 2498–2345
 Sixth Dynasty of Egypt: 2345–2181
 First Intermediate Period of Egypt
 Seventh Dynasty of Egypt: 2181, usually considered spurious
 Eighth Dynasty of Egypt: 2181–2160
 Ninth Dynasty of Egypt: 2160–2130
 Tenth Dynasty of Egypt: 2130–2040
 Early Eleventh Dynasty of Egypt: 2134–2061
 Middle Kingdom of Egypt
 Late Eleventh Dynasty of Egypt: 2061–1991
 Twelfth Dynasty of Egypt: 1991–1803
 Thirteenth Dynasty of Egypt: 1803–1649
 Fourteenth Dynasty of Egypt: 1705–1690
 Second Intermediate Period of Egypt
 Fifteenth Dynasty of Egypt: 1674–1535
 Sixteenth Dynasty of Egypt: 1660–1600
 Abydos Dynasty | | 1650–1600
 Seventeenth Dynasty of Egypt: 1580–1549
 New Kingdom of Egypt
 Eighteenth Dynasty of Egypt: 1549–1292
 Nineteenth Dynasty of Egypt: 1292–1189
 Twentieth Dynasty of Egypt: 1189–1077
 Third Intermediate Period of Egypt
 Twenty-first Dynasty of Egypt: 1069–945
 Twenty-second Dynasty of Egypt: 945–720
 Twenty-third Dynasty of Egypt: 837–728
 Twenty-fourth Dynasty of Egypt: 732–720
 Twenty-fifth Dynasty of Egypt: 732–653
 Late Period of ancient Egypt
 Twenty-sixth Dynasty of Egypt: 672–525
 History of Achaemenid Egypt: 525 BC to 332 BC
 Twenty-seventh Dynasty of Egypt: 525–404
 Twenty-eighth Dynasty of Egypt: 404–398
 Twenty-ninth Dynasty of Egypt: 398–380
 Thirtieth Dynasty of Egypt: 380–343
 Thirty-first Dynasty of Egypt: 343–332
 History of Ptolemaic Egypt: 332 BC to 30 BC
 Argead Dynasty | 332–305
 Ptolemaic Kingdom | 305–30
 History of Roman Egypt: 30 BC to 639 AD
 Diocese of Egypt c. 381 to 539
 Sasanian Egypt: 619 to 629
 History of Arab Egypt: 639 to 1517
 Muslim conquest of Egypt
 Saladin in Egypt 1163 to 1174
 History of Ottoman Egypt: 1517 to 1805
 History of Egypt under the Muhammad Ali dynasty: 1805 to 1882
 Muhammad Ali's seizure of power
 History of modern Egypt: since 1882
 History of Egypt under the British: 1882 to 1956
 1919 Egyptian revolution
 Unilateral Declaration of Egyptian Independence
 Egypt during World War II
 History of republican Egypt 1952 to present
 History of Egypt under Gamal Abdel Nasser 1952-1970
 1952 Egyptian revolution
 Republic of Egypt (1953–58)
 History of Egypt under Anwar Sadat 1970 to 1981
 History of Egypt under Hosni Mubarak 1981-2011
 Egyptian crisis (2011–14)
 2011 Egyptian revolution (also called "25th of January revolution")
 June 2013 Egyptian protests
 2013 Egyptian coup d'état
 Post-coup unrest in Egypt (2013–2014)

History of Egypt, by region 
 History of Alexandria
 Timeline of Alexandria
 History of Cairo
 Timeline of Cairo
 History of Giza
 History of Luxor
 History of Memphis, Egypt
 History of the Nile Delta
 History of Port Said
 Timeline of Port Said
 History of the Sinai Peninsula
 History of Suez

History of Egypt, by subject 
 List of Egyptian inventions and discoveries
 DNA history of Egypt
 Egyptian capitals throughout history
 Egyptomania
 History of the Jews in Egypt
 Political history of Egypt
 History of the Egyptian Constitution
 Military history of Egypt
 List of wars involving Egypt
 History of the Egyptian parliament
 Population history of Egypt
 History of timekeeping devices in Egypt

Culture of Egypt 
Culture of Egypt
 Egyptians
 Architecture of Egypt
Ottoman architecture in Egypt
 Cuisine of Egypt
 Languages of Egypt
 Egyptian language
 Media in Egypt
 National symbols of Egypt
 Coat of arms of Egypt
 Flag of Egypt
 National anthem of Egypt
 Prostitution in Egypt
 Public holidays in Egypt
 Religion in Egypt
 Islam in Egypt
 Christianity in Egypt
 Judaism in Egypt
 Hinduism in Egypt
 World Heritage Sites in Egypt

Art in Egypt 
 Art in Egypt (see also Art of Ancient Egypt)
 Contemporary art in Egypt
 Cinema of Egypt
 Literature of Egypt
 Music of Egypt
 Television in Egypt
 Theatre in Egypt

Sports in Egypt 
Sports in Egypt
 Egypt at the Olympics
 Football in Egypt

Economy and infrastructure of Egypt 
Economy of Egypt
 Economic rank, by nominal GDP (2007): 52nd (fifty-second)
 Agriculture in Egypt
 Communications in Egypt
 Internet in Egypt
 Companies of Egypt
Currency of Egypt: Pound
ISO 4217: EGP
 Energy in Egypt
 Health care in Egypt
 Mining in Egypt
 National Bank of Egypt
 Tourism in Egypt
 Transport in Egypt
 Airports in Egypt
 Rail transport in Egypt
 Water supply and sanitation in Egypt

Education in Egypt 
Education in Egypt

See also

Egypt

Index of Egypt-related articles
List of ancient Egypt topics
List of international rankings
List of modern Egypt-related topics
Member state of the United Nations
Outline of Africa
Outline of Palestine 
Outline of Israel
Outline of Libya
Outline of Sudan
Outline of geography

References

External links

 Eternal Egypt
 Leonard William King, History of Egypt, Chaldæa, Syria, Babylonia, and Assyria in the Light of Recent Discovery, Project Gutenberg.
 Gaston Camille Charles Maspero, History of Egypt, Chaldæa, Syria, Babylonia, and Assyria, in 12 volumes, Project Gutenberg.
 Rural poverty in Egypt (IFAD)
 Ancient Egyptian Civilization - Aldokkan
 Encyclopædia Britannica's Egypt Country Page
 Egyptian Government Services Portal
 Egypt State Information Services
 Egypt Information Portal - available in Arabic and English
 BBC News Country Profile - Egypt
 CIA World Factbook - Egypt
 Amnesty International's 2005 Report on Egypt.
 US State Department - Egypt includes Background Notes, Country Study and major reports
Business Anti-Corruption Portal Egypt Country Profile
 Congressional Research Service (CRS) Reports regarding Egypt
 
 
 Egypt Maps - Perry–Castañeda Map Collection
 Egyptian History (urdu) 
 By Nile and Tigris, a narrative of journeys in Egypt and Mesopotamia on behalf of the British museum between the years 1886 and 1913, by Sir E. A. Wallis Budge, 1920 (a searchable facsimile at the University of Georgia Libraries; DjVu & layered PDF format)
Egypt Online Directory
 The Egyptian Organization for Human Rights 
 PortSaid Free-zone forums

 
Outlines of countries